Kazimierz Franciszek Zimny (4 June 1935 – 30 June 2022) was a Polish athlete, who competed mainly in the 5000 metres.

He competed for Poland in the 5000 metres at the 1960 Summer Olympics held in Rome, Italy, where he won the bronze medal.

References

External links 
 
 European Championships results by discipline

1935 births
2022 deaths
Polish male long-distance runners
Olympic bronze medalists for Poland
Athletes (track and field) at the 1956 Summer Olympics
Athletes (track and field) at the 1960 Summer Olympics
Olympic athletes of Poland
People from Tczew
European Athletics Championships medalists
Sportspeople from Pomeranian Voivodeship
Medalists at the 1960 Summer Olympics
Olympic bronze medalists in athletics (track and field)
Lechia Gdańsk athletes